Benvenuti al Nord (eng: "Welcome to the North") is a 2012 Italian comedy film directed by Luca Miniero.

It is the sequel of the high-grossing film Benvenuti al Sud. It also obtained a great commercial success, gaining more than 27 million euros during its Italian theatrical release; it had the third best opening in Italian market history.

Plot
While Alberto is back in his beloved northern Italy in Milan, his friend Mattia is still in Naples with his friends. He has problems with his wife Maria, because she wants him to take his postal job seriously, now that the two have a son to look after. Then after a dispute, Mattia decides to transfer to northern Italy, in the town of Pordenone. Mattia appears to be willing to leave his little town, but as soon as the transfer comes through, he begins to despair. Many locals offer their opinions; his wise old mother tells him that the people in northern Italy are terribly cold and cruel. Mattia is slightly reassured and in the blink of an eye is in Milan, a whole new world for him as a citizen of the South. Alberto welcomes him very coldly because he is in big trouble. The director of Milan's largest postal company intends to provide Italy with a whole new economic plan from Japan to modify the postal service. Mattia starts working in the post office where Alberto is the deputy director, but he soon realizes how different the local mentality is: people are not like that back home.

Much like Benvenuti al Sud, this film ironically jokes about the differences and diversity from the South to the North of Italy, occasionally challenging and often confirming these stereotypes.

Cast
Claudio Bisio as Alberto Colombo
Alessandro Siani as  Mattia Volpe
Angela Finocchiaro as  Silvia Colombo/Erminia, her mother
Valentina Lodovini as  Maria Flagello
Nando Paone as  Costabile Piccolo (Little Constable)
Giacomo Rizzo as  Costabile Grande (Big Constable)
Paolo Rossi as  Palmisan
 Fulvio Falzarano as  Mario
Katia Follesa as Taxi driver
 Carlo Giuseppe Gabardini  as Barman
Emma as herself

References

External links

Italian comedy films
2010s Italian-language films
Films set in Milan
Films set in Campania
2012 films
Italian sequel films
Films directed by Luca Miniero
Films set in Lombardy
2012 comedy films